Mirdeh-ye Sofla (also Romanized as Mīrdeh-ye Soflá) is a village in Dabuy-ye Shomali Rural District, Sorkhrud District, Mahmudabad County, Mazandaran Province, Iran. At the 2006 census, its population was 170, in 50 families.

References 

Populated places in Mahmudabad County